Pekalongan Batik Museum is a batik museum located in Pekalongan, Central Java, Indonesia.

History
The building of the museum was formerly the City Hall of Pekalongan (1906), located in the city center along with other important colonial buildings such as the church and the post office.  

The museum was officially established by the Ministry of Education and Culture of Central Java on July 12, 1972.

Collection
The Museum has a collection of wide range of Batik motive and design of Pekalongan and the surrounding area, as well as information on the development of batik starting from the Dutch era to the influence of Japan in the periode of Second World War with its Hokokai Javanese motives.

Facility
The museum contains an office space, a batik shop, a library, and seminar rooms. There is also a workshop to learn about batik-making process.

See also 
List of museums and cultural institutions in Indonesia

References 

pekalongan
1972 establishments in Indonesia
Museums established in 1972
Museums in Central Java
Textile museums
Art museums and galleries in Indonesia
Batik